The 1970–71 National Hurling League was the 40th season of the National Hurling League.

Division 1

Cork came into the season as defending champions of the 1969-70 season.

On 23 May 1971, Limerick won the title following a 3-12 to 3-11 win over Tipperary in the final. It was their first league title since the 1946-47 season and their 6th National League title overall.

Kilkenny's Eddie Keher was the Division 1 top scorer with 2-50.

Division 1A table

Group stage

Division 1B table

Group stage

Play-offs

Knock-out stage

Quarter-finals

Semi-finals

Final

Scoring statistics

Top scorers overall

Top scorers in a single game

Division 2

Division 2 table

References

National Hurling League seasons
League
League